Clare Tree Major (1880 – 10 October 1954) was a stage director, playwright, producer of children's theater, and actress. She first acted in London, but in 1914 she came to New York to perform with the Washington Square Players. She was the first British actress to tour America from coast to coast. From the 1920s on she worked exclusively on theater for children, writing plays and sending professional actors on tour to perform them.

Biography
She was born in 1880 in England. She migrated to the United States in 1914. In 1924 she started the Children's Theatre of New York. In 1925 she produced the play The Little Poor Man. She founded the Clare Tree Major Theatre Company in 1927.

She died on 10 October 1954 in Manhattan.

Legacy
The Clare Tree Major papers, 1912-1954, are held in the New York Public Library.

References

External links

The Traveling Plays of Clare Tree Major at ERIC

1880 births
1954 deaths
20th-century British actresses
British stage actresses
British dramatists and playwrights
British theatre directors
British emigrants to the United States